Ryan Stephen Sugden (born 26 December 1980 in Bradford, West Yorkshire) is a professional footballer, who plays for Bradford Park Avenue. He was released by Morecambe at the end of the 2003/04 season and signed by Halifax on a free transfer in July 2004. In January 2007, he was given a further free transfer, this time to Farsley. In July 2008 he signed for Bradford Park Avenue. His spell at Bradford was only short and at the end of the month he was on the move again, this time to the newly formed FC Halifax Town.

Sugden is a striker who has previously played for Oldham Athletic, Scarborough, Chester City, Burton Albion, Morecambe and Halifax. He turned down a move to York City on 31 August 2006.

Honours
Individual
Football Conference Goalscorer of the Month: September 2002

References

External links

1980 births
Living people
Footballers from Bradford
English footballers
Association football forwards
Oldham Athletic A.F.C. players
Scarborough F.C. players
Chester City F.C. players
Burton Albion F.C. players
Morecambe F.C. players
Halifax Town A.F.C. players
Farsley Celtic A.F.C. players
Bradford (Park Avenue) A.F.C. players
FC Halifax Town players
English Football League players
National League (English football) players